The Seafarer 37 is an American trailerable sailboat that was designed by McCurdy & Rhodes as a cruiser and first built in 1980.

Production
The design was built by Seafarer Yachts in the United States, starting in 1980, but the company went out of business in 1985, The boat was the last design to enter production by Seafarer.

Design
The Seafarer 37 is a recreational keelboat, built predominantly of fiberglass, with wood trim. It has a masthead sloop rig, a raked stem, a slightly reverse transom, a skeg-mounted rudder controlled by a wheel and a fixed fin keel or optional shoal draft keel. It displaces  and carries  of lead ballast.

The boat is fitted with an inboard engine for docking and maneuvering.

For sailing downwind the design may be equipped with a symmetrical spinnaker.

See also
List of sailing boat types

References

External links
Photo of a Seafarer 37 showing the hull and keel shape

Keelboats
1980s sailboat type designs
Sailing yachts 
Trailer sailers
Sailboat type designs by McCurdy & Rhodes
Sailboat types built by Seafarer Yachts